Aldridge School is a mixed secondary school and sixth form with academy status located in Aldridge, in the Metropolitan Borough of Walsall in the West Midlands, England. The school is recognised as a Science College.  The current head is Mr. Worth.

History
The school was formed in 1975 by merging  Aldridge Grammar School with Tynings County Secondary Modern School, which were based in adjacent buildings on the same campus.

Aldridge Grammar School opened in September 1959 and was an 11-18 selective school. The original Headmaster was Eric Ioan Emlyn Whitman, BSc (1909-1990) who had previously played first class cricket for Glamorgan. He served for 15 years until his retirement in July 1974

In September 2003, Aldridge School became a Science College. Since then, it has invested in science equipment for each subject, as well as a biology block.  The school has 15 laboratories with prep rooms and technical support.

The school's most recent Ofsted inspection was in 2017 and it was rated Good.

House system
When a pupil joins the school, they are placed in a tutor group which is assigned to one of the four houses - Barr, Daniels, Linley and Scott - each of which houses around 360 pupils.

Music Scholarship
Prospective students can apply for admission through a music scholarship. The school has a large music department with over 50 pupils studying music at A-level.

Notable former pupils

Aldridge Grammar School
 Air Chief Marshal Stuart Peach, Baron Peach, Chief of the Defence Staff (2016–2018)

Aldridge School
 Ellie Simmonds, swimmer
 Jorja Smith, singer-songwriter
 Tom Davies, YouTuber, adventurer
 Lee Sinnott, footballer
 Richard Sinnott, actor
 Richard Taundry, footballer
 Rachel Unitt, footballer
 Martyn Bennett, footballer

References

External links
 Former grammar school

Aldridge
Academies in Walsall
Secondary schools in Walsall